Māori, or  ('the Māori language'), also known as  ('the language'), is an Eastern Polynesian language spoken by the Māori people, the indigenous population of mainland New Zealand. Closely related to Cook Islands Māori, Tuamotuan, and Tahitian, it gained recognition as one of New Zealand's official languages in 1987. The number of speakers of the language has declined sharply since 1945, but a Māori-language revitalisation effort has slowed the decline.

The 2018 New Zealand census reported that about 186,000 people, or 4.0% of the New Zealand population, could hold a conversation in Māori about everyday things. , 55% of Māori adults reported some knowledge of the language; of these, 64% use Māori at home and around 50,000 people can speak the language "very well" or "well".

The Māori language did not have an indigenous writing system. Missionaries arriving from about 1814, such as Thomas Kendall, learned to speak Māori, and introduced the Latin alphabet. In 1817, Tītore and his junior relative, Tui, sailed to England. They visited Professor Samuel Lee at the University of Cambridge and assisted him in the preparation of a grammar and vocabulary of Māori. Thomas Kendall travelled to London with Hongi Hika and Waikato (a lower-ranking Ngāpuhi chief) in 1820, during which time further work was done with Professor Lee, who gave phonetic spellings to a written form of the language, which resulted in a definitive orthography based on North Island usage. By 1830, the Church Missionary Society (CMS) missionaries had revised the orthography for writing the Māori language; for example, Kiddeekiddee became, as in the modern spelling, .

Māori distinguishes between long and short vowels; modern written texts and those designed for standard use usually mark the long vowels with a macron. However, some iwi, such as those within the Tainui confederation of the Waikato, represent long vowels with double letters (for example:  rather than ). This was the standard for older romanisation.

Name 
The English word Maori is a borrowing from the Māori language, where it is spelled .

The Māori-language spelling  (with a macron) has become common in New Zealand English in recent years, particularly in Māori-specific cultural contexts, although the traditional macron-less English spelling is still sometimes seen in general media and government use.

Official status 

New Zealand has two de jure official languages: Māori and New Zealand Sign Language, whereas New Zealand English acts as a de facto official language.  gained its official status with the passing of the Māori Language Act 1987.

Most government departments and agencies have bilingual names—for example, the Department of Internal Affairs is alternatively —and places such as local government offices and public libraries display bilingual signs and use bilingual stationery; some government services now even use the Māori version solely as the official name. Personal dealings with government agencies may be conducted in Māori, but in practice, this almost always requires interpreters, restricting its everyday use to the limited geographical areas of high Māori fluency, and to more formal occasions, such as during public consultation. An interpreter is on hand at sessions of the New Zealand Parliament for instances when a member wishes to speak in Māori. Māori may be spoken in judicial proceedings, but any party wishing to do so must notify the court in advance to ensure an interpreter is available. Failure to notify in advance does not preclude the party speaking in Māori, but the court must be adjourned until an interpreter is available and the party may be held liable for the costs of the delay.

A 1994 ruling by the Judicial Committee of the Privy Council (then New Zealand's highest court) held the Government responsible under the Treaty of Waitangi (1840) for the preservation of the language.  Accordingly, since March 2004, the state has funded Māori Television, broadcast partly in Māori. On 28 March 2008, Māori Television launched its second channel, broadcast entirely in the Māori language, with no advertising or subtitles. The first Māori TV channel, Aotearoa Television Network (ATN) was available to viewers in the Auckland region from 1996 but lasted for only one year.

In 2008, Land Information New Zealand published the first list of official place names with macrons. Previous place name lists were derived from computer systems (usually mapping and geographic information systems) that could not handle macrons.

History

Origins

According to legend, Māori came to New Zealand from Hawaiki. Current anthropological thinking places their origin in eastern Polynesia, mostly likely from the Southern Cook or Society Islands region, and says that they arrived by deliberate voyages in seagoing canoes, possibly double-hulled, and probably sail-rigged. These settlers probably arrived by about AD 1280 (see Origins of the Māori people). Their language and its dialects developed in isolation until the 19th century.

Since about 1800, the Māori language has had a tumultuous history. It started this period as the predominant language of New Zealand. In the 1860s, it became a minority language in the shadow of the English spoken by many settlers, missionaries, gold-seekers, and traders. In the late 19th century, the colonial governments of New Zealand and its provinces introduced an English-style school system for all New Zealanders. From the mid-19th century, due to the Native Schools Act and later the Native Schools Code, the use of Māori in schools was slowly filtered out of the curriculum in order to become more European. Increasing numbers of Māori people learned English.

Decline 
Until the Second World War (1939–1945), most Māori people spoke Māori as their first language. Worship took place in Māori; it functioned as the language of Māori homes; Māori politicians conducted political meetings in Māori, and some literature appeared in Māori, along with many newspapers.

Before 1880, some Māori parliamentarians suffered disadvantages because parliamentary proceedings took place in English. However, by 1900, all Māori members of parliament, such as Āpirana Ngata, were university graduates who spoke fluent English. From this period greater emphasis was placed on Māori learning English, but it was not until the migration of Māori to urban areas after the Second World War that the number of speakers of Māori began to decline rapidly. During this period, Māori was forbidden at many schools, and any use of the language was met with corporal punishment. In recent years, prominent Māori have spoken with sadness about their experiences or experiences of their family members being caned, strapped or beaten in school.

By the 1980s, fewer than 20 per cent of Māori spoke the language well enough to be classed as native speakers. Even many of those people no longer spoke Māori in their homes. As a result, many Māori children failed to learn their ancestral language, and generations of non-Māori-speaking Māori emerged.

Revitalisation efforts 

By the 1970s there were many strategies used to save the language. This included Māori-language revitalization programs such as the Kōhanga Reo movement, which from 1982 immersed infants in Māori from infancy to school age. There followed in 1985 the founding of the first Kura Kaupapa Māori (Years 1 to 8 Māori-medium education programme) and later the first Wharekura (Years 9 to 13 Māori-medium education programme). In 2011 it was reported that although "there was a true revival of te reo in the 1980s and early to mid-1990s … spurred on by the realisation of how few speakers were left, and by the relative abundance of older fluent speakers in both urban neighbourhoods and rural communities", the language has continued to decline." The decline is believed "to have several underlying causes". These include:

 the ongoing loss of older native speakers who have spearheaded the Māori-language revival movement
 complacency brought about by the very existence of the institutions which drove the revival
 concerns about quality, with the supply of good teachers never matching demand (even while that demand has been shrinking)
 excessive regulation and centralised control, which has alienated some of those involved in the movement
 an ongoing lack of educational resources needed to teach the full curriculum in 
 natural language attrition caused by the overwhelming increase of spoken English.

Based on the principles of partnership, Māori-speaking government, general revitalisation and dialectal protective policy, and adequate resourcing, the Waitangi Tribunal has recommended "four fundamental changes":

 Te Taura Whiri (the Māori Language Commission) should become the lead Māori language sector agency. This will address the problems caused by the lack of ownership and leadership identified by the Office of the Auditor-General.
 Te Taura Whiri should function as a Crown–Māori partnership through the equal appointment of Crown and Māori appointees to its board. This reflects [the Tribunal's] concern that te reo revival will not work if responsibility for setting the direction is not shared with Māori.
 Te Taura Whiri will also need increased powers. This will ensure that public bodies are compelled to contribute to 's revival and that key agencies are held properly accountable for the strategies they adopt. For instance, targets for the training of te reo teachers must be met, education curricula involving te reo must be approved, and public bodies in districts with a sufficient number and/or proportion of te reo speakers and schools with a certain proportion of Māori students must submit Māori language plans for approval.
 These regional public bodies and schools must also consult iwi (Māori tribes or tribal confederations) in the preparation of their plans. In this way, iwi will come to have a central role in the revitalisation of te reo in their own areas. This should encourage efforts to promote the language at the grassroots.
The changes set forth by the Tribunal are merely recommendations; they are not binding upon government.

This survey showed a 62% response saying that  was at risk. Albury argues that these results come from the language either not being used enough in common discourse, or from the fact that the number of speakers was inadequate for future language development.

The policies for language revitalisation have been changing in attempts to improve Māori language use and have been working with suggestions from the Waitangi Tribunal on the best ways to implement the revitalisation. The Waitangi Tribunal in 2011 identified a suggestion for language revitalisation that would shift indigenous policies from the central government to the preferences and ideologies of the Māori people. This change recognises the issue of Māori revitalisation as one of indigenous self-determination, instead of the job of the government to identify what would be best for the language and Māori people of New Zealand.

Revival since 2015

Beginning in about 2015, the Māori language underwent a revival as it became increasingly popular, as a common national heritage and shared cultural identity, even among New Zealanders without Māori roots. Surveys from 2018 indicated that "the Māori language currently enjoys a high status in Māori society and also positive acceptance by the majority of non-Māori New Zealanders".

As the status and prestige of the language rose, so did the demand for language classes. Businesses, including Google, Microsoft, Vodafone NZ and Fletcher Building, were quick to adopt the trend as it became apparent that using  made customers think of a company as "committed to New Zealand". The language became increasingly heard in the media and in politics. Prime Minister Jacinda Ardern—who gave her daughter a Māori middle name, and said she would learn both Māori and English—made headlines when she toasted Commonwealth leaders in 2018 with a Māori proverb, and the success of Māori musical groups such as Alien Weaponry and Maimoa further increased the language's presence in social media.

In August 2017, Rotorua became the first city in New Zealand to declare itself as bilingual in the Māori and English languages, meaning that both languages would be promoted. During the same year, Disney's Moana received a Māori-language dubbing, which premiered in Auckland on September 11, during Te Wiki o te Reo Māori. Moana became the first of at least three titles the company agreed to have dubbed in Māori, in collaboration with Matewa Media: a dubbing of The Lion King premiered in Auckland on June 21, 2022, and the Māori version of Frozen premiered on October 25 of the same year. The project was then continued with the production of a Māori dubbing of Pixar's Coco, set to premier during Matariki 2023.

In 2019, the New Zealand government launched the Maihi Karauna Māori language revitalisation strategy with a goal of 1 million people speaking  by 2040.

Also in 2019, Kotahi Rau Pukapuka Trust and Auckland University Press began work on publishing a sizeable library of local and international literature in the language, including the Harry Potter books. 

Some New Zealanders have pushed against the revival, debating the replacement of English-language place names with original Māori names, criticising a Police car having Māori language and graphics, and complaining about  being used by broadcasters. In March 2021, the Broadcasting Standards Authority (BSA) said it would no longer entertain complaints regarding the use of the Māori language in broadcasts. This followed a fivefold increase in complaints to the BSA. The use of Māori in itself does not breach any broadcasting standards.

Linguistic classification 

{{cladogram
|clades=
  {{clade
  |label1=East Polynesian
  |1=
    {{clade
    |1=Rapa Nui
    |label2=Central Eastern
    |2=
      {{clade
      |label1=Tahitic
      |1=
        
      |label2=Marquesic
      |2=

Further reading 
 Benton, R. A. (1984). "Bilingual education and the survival of the Māori language". The Journal of the Polynesian Society, 93(3), 247–266. .
 Benton, R. A. (1988). "The Māori language in New Zealand education". Language, culture and curriculum, 1(2), 75–83. .
 Benton, N. (1989). "Education, language decline and language revitalisation: The case of Maori in New Zealand". Language and Education, 3(2), 65–82. .
 Benton, R. A. (1997). The Maori Language: Dying or Reviving?. NZCER, Distribution Services, Wellington, New Zealand.
 Gagné, N. (2013). Being Maori in the City: Indigenous Everyday Life in Auckland. University of Toronto Press. .
 Holmes, J. (1997). "Maori and Pakeha English: Some New Zealand Social Dialect Data". Language in Society, 26(1), 65–101. . .
 Sissons, J. (1993). "The Systematisation of Tradition: Maori Culture as a Strategic Resource". Oceania, 64(2), 97–116. . .
 Smith, G. H. (2000). "Maori education: Revolution and transformative action". Canadian Journal of Native Education, 24(1), 57.
 Smith, G. H. (2003). "Indigenous struggle for the transformation of education and schooling". Transforming Institutions: Reclaiming Education and Schooling for Indigenous Peoples, 1–14.
 Spolsky, B.. (2003). "Reassessing Māori Regeneration". Language in Society, 32(4), 553–578. . .

External links 

Ngata Māori–English English–Māori Dictionary from Modern Teaching Aids; gives several options and shows use in phrases.
 Te Aka Māori-English, English-Māori Dictionary and Index, online version
A Dictionary of the Maori Language by Herbert W. Williams, at the New Zealand Electronic Text Collection, Te Pūhikotuhi o Aotearoa
 Collection of historic Māori newspapers
 Maori Phonology
 maorilanguage.net Learn the basics of Māori Language with video tutorials
 Maori Language Week at NZHistory – includes a history of the Māori language, the Treaty of Waitangi Māori Language claim and 100 words every New Zealander should know
 Huia Publishers, catalogue includes Tirohia Kimihia the world's first Māori monolingual dictionary for learners
 Publications about Māori language from Te Puni Kōkiri, the Ministry of Māori Development
 Te Reo Maori word list A glossary of commonly used Māori words with English translation
 Materials on Maori are included in the open access Arthur Capell collections (AC1 and AC2) held by Paradisec.

 
Endangered Austronesian languages
Polynesian languages
Languages of New Zealand
Tahitic languages
Vulnerable languages